The Ceylon-German Technical Training Institute (also known as CGTTI or German Tech) is an engineering college located in Moratuwa, Sri Lanka. It is under the preview of the Ministry of Youth Affairs and Skills Development.

It was established in 1959 under an agreement made in 1958 between the Governments of the Federal Republic of Germany and Ceylon to supply training assistance in the maintenance of bus fleet, which belonged to the Ceylon Transport Board (CTB) and was located at the central workshops of the CTB at Werahera. In 1974, the institute was shifted to Moratuwa. CGTTI was under German management with a German Director until 1974, when the management was transferred to Ceylon and a Director/Principal appointed.

References

External links
Website

Technical universities and colleges in Sri Lanka
Educational institutions established in 1959
1959 establishments in Ceylon
Education in Moratuwa
Universities and colleges in Colombo District